Halfmoon Bay lies on the eastern coast of Stewart Island/Rakiura in New Zealand.

The town of Oban lies in the bay.  A small fishing fleet and a ferry service from Bluff use the bay.

The gardens of Moturau Moana built by Isabel Noeline Baker, are New Zealand's southernmost public gardens.

Halfmoon Bay and its neighbour Horseshoe Bay are the subject of a name mix-up, caused by early cartographers. Halfmoon Bay is in fact shaped more like a horseshoe, whereas Horseshoe Bay is shaped like a half moon.

References

Bays of Southland, New Zealand
Landforms of Stewart Island